William Lindsay, 18th Earl of Crawford and 2nd Earl of Lindsay (April 1644 – 6 March 1698) was a Scottish noble and politician.

Lindsay was the eldest son of John Lindsay, 10th Lord Lindsay of the Byres, 17th Earl of Crawford, and 1st Earl of Lindsay, by his wife, Lady Christian Hamilton, daughter of the Earl of Haddington. William succeeded to the earldoms in 1678. He was a zealous Presbyterian, president of the Convention parliament in 1689, a commissioner of the treasury in 1690, and one of the commissioners for settling the government of the Church of Scotland.

He married firstly Lady Mary Johnstone, daughter of 1st Earl of Annandale and Hartfell, in 1670. They had one son:

John Lindsay, 19th Earl of Crawford and 3rd Earl of Lindsay (1672–1713)
Colonel James Lindsay (died 1707), killed at the Battle of Almansa
Patrick Lindsay, dsp

He married secondly Lady Henrietta Fleming, daughter of Charles Seton, 2nd Earl of Dunfermline and widow of 5th Earl of Wigtown, and had further issue.

References

18
William
1644 births
1698 deaths
Lindsay, William Lindsay, 2nd Earl of
Members of the Convention of the Estates of Scotland 1689
Commissioners of the Treasury of Scotland